The 1993–94 Cupa României was the 56th edition of Romania's most prestigious football cup competition.

The title was won by Gloria Bistrița against FC U Craiova.

Format
The competition is an annual knockout tournament.

First round proper matches are played on the ground of the lowest ranked team, then from the second round proper the matches are played on a neutral location.

If a match is drawn after 90 minutes, the game goes into extra time. If the match is still tied, the result is decided by penalty kicks.

From the first edition, the teams from Divizia A entered in competition in sixteen finals, rule which remained till today.

First round proper

|colspan=3 style="background-color:#97DEFF;"|7 December 1993

|-
|colspan=3 style="background-color:#97DEFF;"|8 December 1993

|}

Second round proper

|colspan=3 style="background-color:#97DEFF;"|14 December 1993

|-
|colspan=3 style="background-color:#97DEFF;"|15 December 1993

|}

Quarter-finals

|colspan=3 style="background-color:#97DEFF;"|2 March 1994

|}

Semi-finals

|colspan=3 style="background-color:#97DEFF;"|12 March 1994

|}

Final

References

External links
 romaniansoccer.ro
 Official site
 The Romanian Cup on the FRF's official site

Cupa României seasons
1993–94 in Romanian football
Romania